John Griffiths (29 November 1837 – 1 December 1918) was a British artist who worked in India, noted for his Orientalist works.

Life and career 
He was born in Llanfair Caereinion, Montgomeryshire, on the 29 November 1837, son of Evan Griffiths and his wife Mary Evans of Machynlleth; on his father's death, his mother became housekeeper to Sir James Clark, physician to Queen Victoria. The boy was brought up by his uncle Richard Griffiths, of Neuadd Uchaf farm, Llanfair. Noting his artistic leanings, Sir James had him trained at what is now the Royal College of Art. He then worked at the South Kensington museum, now the V&A, and was engaged in decorating its buildings. He became a Professor of Art and moved to Bombay in 1865 as the principal of the Sir Jamsetjee Jeejebhoy School of Art in Bombay. His chief associate and friend there, was John Lockwood Kipling, father of Rudyard Kipling (Griffiths was a godfather to Rudyard).  It was under Griffiths's superintendence that much of the decoration of the new public buildings of Bombay was designed. Griffiths undertook many commissions, including work on the Victoria Terminus and the High Court. After his decade in Bombay, Griffiths was appointed Principal of the Mayo School of Art and Curator of the Museum in Lahore, now in Pakistan.

One of his major works was the copying of paintings in the Buddhist temples at Ajanta which were published in two large folio volumes "The paintings in the Buddhist Cave Temples at Ajanta".

He retired in 1895, and moved to Manafon, Montgomeryshire and later to Norton, Sherborne, Dorset where he lived until his death on the 1 December 1918. He was married in Bombay to Linette Rebecca Beddome Davis and had two daughters, Helen Margaret Griffiths, and Gladys Linette Myfanwy Griffiths.

See also
 List of Orientalist artists
 Orientalism

References

External links

 Archives

1837 births
1918 deaths
British art teachers
Alumni of the Royal College of Art
British arts administrators
British male painters
Orientalist painters
British people in colonial India
People from Powys
Academic staff of Sir J. J. School of Art
20th-century British painters
19th-century British male artists
20th-century British male artists